The 16003 / 16004 Chennai Central–Nagarsol Express is a Express train belonging to Indian Railways Southern Railway zone that run between Chennai Central and Nagarsol in India. This is the only train that connects Chennai with Kamareddy, Nizamabad, Basar, Mudkhed, Hazur Sahib Nanded, Purna, Parbhani, Jalna, Aurangabad and Nagarsol. There's no other trains that connects these places with Chennai.

Service 
It operates as train number 16003 from Chennai Central to Nagarsol and as train number 16004 in the reverse direction serving the states of Tamil Nadu, Andhra Pradesh, Telangana & Maharashtra .

Coaches

The 16003 / 04 Chennai Central–Nagarsol  Express has Three AC 2-Tier, Three AC 3 Tier, 13 Sleeper Class, 3 General Unreserved & Two SLR (seating with luggage rake) coaches. It doesn't carry a pantry car.

As with most train services in India, coach composition may be amended at the discretion of Indian Railways depending on demand.

Routeing

Traction
As this route is partially electrified, a Arakkonam-based Electric Locomotive WAP-4 loco pulls the train till Dhone after that, a Gooty-based Diesel Locomotive WDP-4 pulls the train to its destination and vice versa.

References

External links
16003 Chennai Central–Nagarsol Express at India Rail Info
16004 Nagarsol–Chennai Central Express at India Rail Info

Express trains in India
Rail transport in Tamil Nadu
Rail transport in Andhra Pradesh
Rail transport in Telangana
Rail transport in Maharashtra
Transport in Chennai